Holland Christian Schools is a private Calvinist school system located in Holland, Michigan. The Holland Christian Schools educate students ranging in age from Pre-K through 12th grade.

The school system was established by members of the Christian Reformed Church.

History
By 1963, it had 2,600 students, with each grade level usually ranging in size from 173 to 200 students. Prior to 1965, Zeeland Christian School only had up to junior high school, and referred high school students to Holland Christian. The Zeeland Christian School high school was scheduled to open in 1965.

Campuses
The system operates the following campuses:
 Secondary schools
 Holland Christian High School (grades 9–12)
 Holland Christian Middle School (grades 6–8)
 Elementary schools
 Rose Park School (grades Preschool-5)
 Pine Ridge School (grades 3–5)
 South Side School (grades Preschool-2)
 Forest School (grades K-2)

Curriculum
The school lifted a ban on teaching the theory of evolution in 1991.

Operations
 the yearly tuition ranges from $6,000 to $8,000, and as of that year it gives scholarships to approximately 33% of the student body.

Culture
There are chapel services three times in each instructional week. Circa the 1970s the school had no dances until recent years.

Notable alumni
 Kirk Cousins - Quarterback for the Minnesota Vikings.
 Betsy DeVos - US Secretary of Education (attended all grade levels and graduated from the high school in 1975) - In 2017 Erica L. Green of The New York Times wrote that "The attention brought by Ms. DeVos [...] has put Holland Christian on the defensive in recent months."
 Bill Huizenga - U.S. Congressman.
 Erik Prince - Founder of Blackwater USA

References

External links 

 Official Site

Private high schools in Michigan
Private middle schools in Michigan
Private elementary schools in Michigan
Buildings and structures in Holland, Michigan
Schools in Ottawa County, Michigan